Salem High School is a public high school located in Salem, New Hampshire, United States. As of 2011, approximately 1,600 students were enrolled. The high school is a comprehensive school, housing both traditional and vocational learning opportunities. The school was established in 1966 and has gone through various renovations. The school offers many unique and different classes, ranging from astronomy to television production.

History
The original high school for the town of Salem was Woodbury High School. In the 1960s it was converted to a middle school, and the current building was built. The school has recently suffered from overcrowding, leading administrators to place portable classrooms on the campus. This also led the neighboring town of Windham, whose students were sent to Salem, to construct its own high school in 2009; the class of 2011 was the last graduating class from Salem High to include students from Windham. All class of 2012 students from Windham were required to transfer to Windham High School, starting at the beginning of the 2009-2010 school year.

The school has various traditions that include the video yearbook in which many of the students are showcased in one way or another.

Senior Safe Night started when students decided to camp out at the high school and chaperones were eventually called for when students were believed to be involved in illicit behavior in their tents. It has grown from a student-led initiative to one run by members of the communities—many of whom are parents of children in the high school—who want to make sure the seniors can have one last night to hang out before graduation in an environment in which there are no drugs or alcohol. There are usually door prizes and a massive yearbook signing towards the beginning of the night when teachers are there to wish the students fun on their night in.

On March 11, 2014, Salem voted to approve a $75 million renovation project for Salem High School and its Career and Technical Education Center. Construction was completed in 2018.

Campus

Seifert Performing Arts Center 
The Seifert Performing Arts Center (SPAC) is a performance and arts education complex. The facility features a 711 seat auditorium, state-of-the-art media console and equipment, half-fly system, full orchestra pit, and dressing rooms with audio/visual monitors. The space is named after Charles Seifert, a local business owner and supposed haunt of the establishment.

Demographics

Extra-curricular activities

Athletics
Salem High School was listed by Sports Illustrated in 2008 as having the best athletics program in the state of New Hampshire.

The varsity football team were state champions in 2009, defeating Nashua North and have won 4 other championships in recent years with Football championships in 1995 when in Division II, 1983 and 1975 in Division I, and when the high school used to be Woodbury High School in 1957 when the school was in Division IV a championship was won then also. This past fall 2021 Coach Steve Abraham in his 2nd season lead the Blue Devils to another Final 4 appearance in Division 1, Including a regular-season win over eventual champion Londondonderry.

The men's varsity basketball team won the Class L state championship in 2007 and 2008 (the first championship in 1995).  The field hockey team won the state championship game six times between 2002 and 2008. Softball has won seventeen Class L state championships (When?-2010), Coach Harold Sachs recorded his 500th win on May 24, 2011. Recently this past June 2021 the Softball program won its 18th State Championship.

The boys' volleyball team has a national record 112-match win streak and have won ten straight state championships (2004–2014) according to NFHS.org.

On June 18, 2010, German exchange student Philipp Becker won the boys' singles tennis tournament when he beat his rival from Londonderry High School. Becker is the first tennis player from Salem to win the boys title.

Its currently rivalry in athletics is with Windham High School with "The Battle of Route 111" since their high school opened in the past 10 years, previously the Blue Devils had "The Battle of Route 28" Rivalry with Pinkerton Academy of Derry.

Performing arts 
The Salem High School Performing Arts Program offers a robust offering of activities to students. The program offers Chorus, Theater Arts, Band and Color Guard. The bands program consist of performing ensembles including Marching Band, Concert Band, Jazz Band, as well as the Salem Blue Devils Winter Percussion Ensemble.  The band program strives to enrich the lives of students through various music experiences. The marching band is open to all students, Grades 9-12, who have previously studied a musical instrument either in or out of school. The Marching band have performed in the Macys Thanksgiving Day Parade, and the Fiesta Bowl Parade. The theater arts program performs in the Seifert Performing arts center every year in a fall and spring play. They also participate in the NHETG spring festival.

Clubs 
As of September 2018, there were 33 individual clubs students could choose to join. There are multiple student organizations such as the LABTA Club and the Muslim Student Association. Other academic based clubs include National Honor Society,  Math Team, Language Clubs, and Homework Club. Other clubs are career and technical skills based, like FBLA, Film Club, Girls Who Code, and the Robotics Club.

Notable alumni

Matt Frahm, racing driver
Pamela Gidley, actress and model
Breanne Hill, actress
Katie King-Crowley, Olympic gold medalist in ice hockey
Dan Stemkoski, StarCraft 2 eSports commentator
John E. Sununu (class of 1982), former U.S. senator

References

External links
 

Salem, New Hampshire
Schools in Rockingham County, New Hampshire
Public high schools in New Hampshire